Gurukumar Bhalachandra Parulkar is an Indian cardiothoracic surgeon and a professor emeritus at King Edward Memorial Hospital and Seth Gordhandas Sunderdas Medical College. He also served as the president of the Association of Surgeons of India in 1984.

Born on 1 December 1931 at Mumbai in the Indian state of Maharashtra, Parulkar served as an associate of Prafulla Kumar Sen, a pioneer of cardiac surgery in India. A graduate of the University of Mumbai, he did advanced training at Baylor College of Medicine and on his return to India, he introduced the technique of hypothermic circulatory arrest technique of resection of aortic aneurysms in India. He was one of the doctors who attended to the victim in the Aruna Shanbaug case.

Parulkar received the Dr. B. C. Roy Award from the Medical Council of India in 1997. The Government of India awarded him the Padma Bhushan, the third highest civilian award, in 1998. He is also a recipient of the 2009 The Marathon Teacher Award of the Maharashtra University of Health Sciences and a number of other honors.

See also

 Vascular surgery
 Aneurysm

References

Further reading 
 

Recipients of the Padma Bhushan in medicine
1931 births
Dr. B. C. Roy Award winners
People from Mumbai
University of Mumbai alumni
Baylor College of Medicine alumni
Academic staff of King Edward Medical University
Indian cardiac surgeons
Indian medical writers
Indian medical academics
Living people